Rhonda Mullins (born 1966) is a Canadian literary translator, who won the Governor General's Award for French to English translation at the 2015 Governor General's Awards for Twenty-One Cardinals, her translation of Jocelyne Saucier's Les Héritiers de la mine.

She has been a shortlisted nominee for the award on four other occasions: at the 2007 Governor General's Awards for The Decline of the Hollywood Empire (Hervé Fischer, Le déclin de l’empire hollywoodien); at the 2013 Governor General's Awards for And the Birds Rained Down (Jocelyne Saucier, Il pleuvait des oiseaux); at the 2014 Governor General's Awards for Guyana (Élise Turcotte); and at the 2016 Governor General's Awards for Guano (Louis Carmain).

She is an alumna of Concordia University and the University of Ottawa.

References

1966 births
Canadian translators
Governor General's Award-winning translators
French–English translators
Concordia University alumni
University of Ottawa alumni
Living people